Habronattus trimaculatus is a species of jumping spider. It is found only in peninsular Florida in the United States.

References

External links

 

Salticidae
Articles created by Qbugbot
Spiders described in 1945